McArthur Lake is a lake in Fort Bragg, North Carolina. It is a reservoir formed by an earth dam. The lake is used for recreational fishing.

Physical

It is owned by Fort Bragg.
It was formed in 1935 by construction of Mcarthur Lake Dam.

Hydrology

McArthur Lake is in the northern watershed in the west of the reservation.
As of 2007 Fort Bragg still owned and operated its water distribution system, although there were plans for it to be privatized.
The water was drawn from Little River.
McKellars Lake and McArthur Lake provided storage for water that could be released into the Little River if needed.
This had never actually been required.

Recreation

The lake is used for recreation.
As with all Fort Bragg lakes apart from Smith Lake, it is off limits to swimming, wind surfing, water skiing and use of personal watercraft such as jet skis.
There is a ramp for launching boats.
There is no boating motor size restriction.
The lake is classed as "managed" but not "intensively managed".
The water is not treated by practices such as liming and fertilizing.
The fish population is respectable and is usually sustained naturally without any supplementary stocking.
Fish include largemouth bass, bluegill, redear sunfish, warmouth, flier, pickerel and bullhead catfish.

Notes

Sources

Lakes of North Carolina